Jaswant Singh Khalra (1952–1995) was a prominent Sikh human rights activist.

He garnered global attention for his research concerning 25,000 illegal killings and cremations involving the Punjab police, and that the police had even killed about 2,000 police officers who refused to cooperate.

Khalra was last seen in September 1995, washing his car in front of his house in Amritsar. Six Punjab police officials were later convicted and sentenced to imprisonment for Khalra's abduction and murder.

Activism 
Jaswant Singh Khalra was the director of a bank in the city of Amritsar in Punjab during the militancy period in Punjab. Following Operation Blue Star, the assassination of Indira Gandhi, and the 1984 Anti-Sikh Riots, the police were empowered to detain suspects for any reason, ostensibly as suspected terrorists. The police were accused of killing unarmed suspects in staged shootouts, and burning thousands of dead bodies to cover up the murders.

Khalra was investigating four major cases at one time and continued to collect evidence and witnesses. These cases included the custodial killing of Behla, human-shield case concerning the death of seven civilians, cremation of 25,000 unidentified bodies in Punjab and that police had killed about 2,000 police officers not collaborating in counter-terror operations. The Central Bureau of Investigation, a Union Government agency, concluded that police had unlawfully cremated 2,097 people in Tarn Taran district alone.

As per CBI investigation records quoted by Supreme Court (speaking through Sathasivam J - as his Lordship was then - and Chauhan J in Prithpal Singh v State of Punjab) he was a human rights activist working on the abduction, elimination, and cremation of unclaimed human bodies during the Militancy Period in Indian Punjab. The court observed that the police had been eliminating young persons under the pretext of being militants and disposing of their bodies without record.

While searching for some colleagues who went missing, Khalra discovered files from the municipal corporation of Amritsar which contained the names, ages, and addresses of those who had been killed and later burnt by the police. Further research revealed cases in 3 other districts in Punjab, increasing the list by thousands.

The National Human Rights Commission released a list of some of the identified bodies that were cremated by the police with the Police Districts of Amritsar, Majitha, and Tarn Taran between June 1984 and December 1994. The Supreme Court of India and the National Human Rights Commission of India have certified the validity of this data.

Jaswant Singh Khalra asserted there could have been over 25,000 Sikhs illegally killed and cremated by the state. Till date, families of those who "disappeared" during the insurgency are awaiting confirmation of the fate of their missing loved ones. A list of names has been published by Tribune India.

Family 
Khalra's grandfather, Harnam Singh, was an activist in the Ghadar movement for the independence of India. Harnam Singh was also one of 376 passengers of the ship, Komagata Maru which famously sailed from British-Hong Kong, via Shanghai, China, and Yokohama, Japan, to Vancouver, British Columbia, Canada, in 1914, carrying 376 passengers from Punjab, British India. Of them, 24 were admitted to Canada, but the other 352 passengers were not allowed to disembark in Canada, and the ship was forced to return to India. Harnam Singh among others were arrested upon their arrival and was tried in Lahore conspiracy case against the British empire and was later imprisoned in Lahore jail.

Jaswant Singh's wife Paramjit Kaur Khalra has continued her husband's activism and is a noted human rights activist herself.
Jaswant Singh's two children Navkiran Kaur and Janmeet Singh are his living children. His Living family members includes His father Kartar Singh,mother Mukhtar Kaur, three brothers Rajinder Singh Sandhu, Amarjeet Singh Sandhu(both lives in UK) and Gurdev Singh Sandhu ( lives in Austria) and five sisters Paritam Kaur, Mohinder Kaur, Harjinder Kaur(retired BEO) Balbir Kaur(retired Headteacher)and Beant Kaur.

Death
On 6 September 1995, while washing his car in front of his house, Khalra was abducted by personnel of Punjab Police and taken to Jhabal Police Station. Although witnesses gave statements implicating the police, and named Director General of the Punjab Police, Kanwar Pal Singh Gill as a conspirator, police have denied ever arresting or detaining Khalra. Further, the police have claimed to have had no knowledge of his whereabouts.

In 1996, the Central Bureau of Investigation found evidence that he was held at a police station in Tarn Taran and recommended the prosecution of nine Punjab police officials for murder and kidnapping. Those accused of his murder were not charged for ten years, though one of the suspects, Senior Superintendent of Police Ajit Singh Sandhu was murdered in 1997. However, his murder was staged as a suicide. On 18 November 2005, six Punjab police officials were convicted and sentenced to seven years imprisonment for Khalra's abduction and murder. On 16 October 2007, a division bench of Punjab and Haryana High Court, chaired by Justices Mehtab Singh Gill and A N Jindal, extended the sentence to life imprisonment for four accused:  Satnam Singh, Surinder Pal Singh, Jasbir Singh (all former sub inspectors) and Prithipal Singh (former head constable).

On 11 April 2011, the Supreme Court of India dismissed the appeal filed against the sentence to life imprisonment for the four accused, scathingly criticizing the atrocities committed by Punjab Police during the disturbance period.

Memorial
The City Council of Fresno approved the proposal to rename Victoria Park after Jaswant Singh Khalra on 26 August 2017. After bringing the motion before the City Council, the council member Oliver Baines said, "Jaswant Singh Khalra for Punjabi/Sikh Community is like Martin Luther King Jr. for my community."

See also
List of solved missing person cases

References

External links 

Detailed biography of Jaswant Singh Khalra (PDF) from Reduced to Ashes: The Insurgency and Human Rights in Punjab, Final Report: Volume One by Ram Narayan Kumar et al.

1952 births
1990s missing person cases
1995 murders in India
1995 deaths
Activists from Punjab, India
Deaths in police custody in India
Indian human rights activists
Indian murder victims
Indian Sikhs
Insurgency in Punjab
Male murder victims
Missing person cases in India
Murder convictions without a body
People from Amritsar
People murdered in India
Punjabi people
Sikh martyrs
Enforced disappearances in India